Jerome Lowenstein is a licensed medical doctor with a specialty in nephrology, medical specialty related to kidneys, in New York, New York. He received his M.D, also known as Doctor of Medicine, from New York University in 1957. He continued to work at New York University, more commonly known as NYU, as a Professor of Medicine in the Division of Nephrology, as Firm Chief in the NYU School of Medicine, as a clinician in several clinical practices in New York, as a researcher, and also as an author. He is also the Senior Nonfiction Editor for the Bellevue Literary Review. He developed a program at NYU for Humanistic Aspects of Medical Education which he directed and was intended for third year involved in clerkship. He is currently retired.

Publications 
During his medical and research career he has conducted many clinical trials and has done extensive research in several topics in medicine. It is listed that he has a total of 92 publications.

Journals

Books 
He has three books currently published: 

 
 
 

He has additional writings published in several websites, including the Bellevue Literary Review, and short stories that include Illuminating the Art of Medicine and Gabrielle.

References 

American nephrologists
Year of birth missing (living people)
New York University alumni
American medical writers
20th-century American non-fiction writers
Writers from New York City
Living people